Osage is an unincorporated community located within the Echelon section of Voorhees Township in Camden County, New Jersey, United States. The name Osage derives from a small group of Indians of the Sioux tribe from the Midwestern United States that settled in the area.

In the area of Osage is Osage Elementary School, one of four elementary schools in the township. Osage has over 500 students. It is located directly across from the Voorhees Town Center (formerly known as the Echelon Mall).

References

Voorhees Township, New Jersey
Unincorporated communities in Camden County, New Jersey
Unincorporated communities in New Jersey